François Fratellini (1879-1951) was a French circus clown. He performed as an elegant Whiteface. He was a member of the Fratellini Family. François  was born in Paris, in 1879, and died there in 1951. He had two brothers: Paul Fratellini (1877 - 1940) and Albert Fratellini (1886 - 1961).

1879 births
1951 deaths
French clowns
French people of Italian descent